Californie may refer to:
 The French name of California 
 An arrondissement in Casablanca in Morocco

Californië may refer to:

 Californië, Gelderland, a hamlet in the Netherlands
 Californië, Limburg, a hamlet in the Netherlands
 the Dutch name of California